The Taifa of Santa Maria do Algarve was a medieval Islamic taifa Moorish kingdom or emirate located in what is now southern Portugal, that existed from 1018 to 1051. From 1051 until 1091, it was under the forcible control of Seville via Abbad II al-Mu'tadid. Known as the Banu Harun, their descendants remained as Qadis of the city until its reconquest by Portugal in 1249, the last of whom being Aloandro Ben Bekar.

List of Emirs

Harunid dynasty
Sa'id: c. 1018–1041/2
Muhammad al-Mu'tasim: 1041/2–1051
To Seville: 1051–1091

See also
 List of Sunni Muslim dynasties

Sources

References

1051 disestablishments
States and territories established in 1018
Santa Maria de Algarve
11th century in Portugal
Taifas in Portugal
History of the Algarve